Dashields Lock and Dam is a fixed-crest dam on the Ohio River. It is located less than 15 miles down stream of Pittsburgh. There are two locks, one for commercial barge traffic that's 600 feet long by 110 feet wide, and the recreational auxiliary lock is 360 feet long by 56 feet wide.  Dashields locks averages about 450 commercial lock throughs every month and  200-300 lock throughs a month on the recreational auxiliary lock.

See also
 List of locks and dams of the Ohio River
 List of locks and dams of the Upper Mississippi River

References

External links
 U.S. Army Corps of Engineers, Pittsburgh District
 U.S. Army Corps of Engineers, Huntington District
 U.S. Army Corps of Engineers, Louisville District

Dams on the Ohio River
Dams in Pennsylvania
Dams completed in 1929
Locks of Pennsylvania
United States Army Corps of Engineers, Pittsburgh District